The 2018–19 Barbados Premier League was the 73rd season of the Barbados Premier League, the top division football competition in Barbados. The season began on 21 October 2018. The regular season ended on 5 May 2019, which was followed by three-legged final in which Barbados Defence Force defeated Weymouth Wales for their sixth title.

Regular season
As with the previous season, the 12 teams were divided into two zones of six teams each. Barbados Soccer Academy, St. Andrew Lions, and Youth Milan were promoted from the previous season of Barbados Division One.

Zone 1

Zone 2

Championship final

First leg

Second leg

Third leg

Barbados Defence Force won championship qualified for Caribbean Club Shield.

Third place match

Relegation playoffs

Semifinals

Youth Milan and Barbados Soccer Academy relegated.

Final

Porey Springs relegated.

Finalists

References

External links
Barbados Football Association

Barbados Premier Division seasons
Barbados
1